Allate (Dargwa: ГӀялате) is a rural locality (a selo) in Musultemakhinsky Selsoviet, Levashinsky District, Republic of Dagestan, Russia. The population was 712 as of 2010. There are 4 streets.

Geography 
Allate is located 29 km southwest of Levashi (the district's administrative centre) by road. Gurgumakhi and Musultemakhi are the nearest rural localities.

Nationalities 
Dargins live there.

References 

Rural localities in Levashinsky District